Evanston is a residential neighbourhood in the northwest quadrant of Calgary, Alberta. Located near the north edge of the city, it is bounded by the Kincora community across Shaganappi Trail to the southwest, the Sage Hill community to the west, Sarcee Trail to the west, 144 Avenue N.W. to the north, 14 Street N.W. to the east, and the Panorama Hills and Hidden Valley communities across Stoney Trail to the southeast and south. It is one of five communities located within the Symons Valley area.

Evanston is represented in the Calgary City Council by the Ward 2 councillor.

Demographics 

See also 
List of neighbourhoods in Calgary

References

External links 

Neighbourhoods in Calgary